Stanley House (Danish: Stanleys Gård) is a Rococo mansion overlooking Christianshavn Canal in the Christianshavn neighbourhood of Copenhagen, Denmark. The house takes its name after its founder,  Simon Carl Stanley, and was possibly built to his own design.

History

Stanley family
 
Early in his career, Simon Carl Stanley spent 20 years in England from where his father had emigrated to Denmark. His assignments included work on Compton Place. In 1746 he returned to Denmark, where he became master sculptor at the Holmen naval base as well as a professor at the Royal Danish Academy of Fine Arts. His house at Christianshavn Canal was built in 1755–56, possibly to his own design.

After his father's death, Carl Frederik Stanley, who was also a sculptor and a professor at the Academy, lived in the building from 1770 to 1772 and again from 1779 to 1782.

19th century

The Stanley House was in 1801 acquired by ship captain Philip Ryan (1766-1808). He was originally from Saint Croix where his father Henry Ryan was the owner of the sugar plantation Mary's Fancy. Ryan had moved to Copenhagen in 1780 where he initially worked for Dybzfekd, Meyer & Co.. He was licensed as a ship's captain in 1895 and in 1801 started his own trading firm in a partnership with his brother George Ryan. 

Stanley's former property was in 1804 purchased by coach maker Hames Fife. He had come to Denmark to work for a new carriage factory in 1798. In circa 1702, vegan trading in new and old carriages out of a remise at Applebyes Plads and by 1704 he was listed as a coach maker at the same address.

In the 19th century, the building was owned by Frederik Løwener, owner of an iron foundry, who rented it out to two of Denmark's leading painters of the time. Constantin Hansen lived on the first floor from 1847 until 1856 and P. C. Skovgaard lived in the building from 1851 until 1854 when he moved a little down the street to No. 2.

Christianshavn Congregation House

When Christian's Church became a parish church within the Church of Denmark, it needed a venue for its activities in the community and Stanley House was acquired by the congregation on 25 April 1916. The building was renovated and inaugurated as a church centre by Bishop Ostenfeld on Store Bededag 1917.

Later history

Due to the economic burden of running and maintaining the building, it was ceded to Amagerbro Provsti on 1 January 1994 and now serves both Church of Our Saviour and Christian's parish, the two parishes in Christianshavn.

Architecture
The building is designed in Rococo style. Originally, only the central portion of the building stood in full height while the two side wings were of only one storey high until they were extended in 1783. The building now consists of two storeys and a cellar under a mansard roof with black-glazed tiles.

The main facade is decorated with lesenes and has a Palladian window, a rare sight in Danish architecture and a sign of influence from England. The rest of the building relies on Danish traditions and shows influence from Nicolai Eigtved. Constantin Hansen completed interior decorations on doors and panels.

On the rear side of the building, it is connected to a low complex of old industrial buildings which fills the rest of the block bounded by Store Søndervoldstræde, Dronningegade and Lille Søndervoldstræde

Current use
Stanley House now serves as parish house (sognegård) for the Parish of Our Saviour. It contains a residence for the rector at Church of Our Saviour, offices and rooms which can be rented by members of the congregation in connection with funerals.

References

External links
 Source
 Source
 Source
 Source

Houses in Copenhagen
Listed residential buildings in Copenhagen
Listed buildings and structures in Christianshavn
Houses completed in 1755
Rococo architecture in Copenhagen